In probability theory and statistics, variance measures how far a set of numbers are spread out.

Variance may also refer to:
 Variance (accounting), the difference between a budgeted, planned or standard cost and the actual amount incurred/sold
 Variance Films, a film distribution company founded in 2008
 Variance (land use), a deviation from the set of rules a municipality applies to land use and land development
 Variance (album) (2009), third album by electronic musician Jega
 Variance (magazine), an American online music magazine

See also
 Covariance, probability theory and statistics
 Covariance and contravariance (category theory)
 Covariance and contravariance (computer science)
 Genetic variance (disambiguation)
 Invariance (physics)